Praveen Dubey (born 1 July 1993) is an Indian cricketer who plays for Karnataka in domestic cricket. He is a right-handed batsman and leg break googly bowler. He was signed up by Royal Challengers Bangalore at the 2016 IPL players auction for 35 lakh. In February 2017, he was bought by the Royal Challengers Bangalore team for the 2017 Indian Premier League for 10 lakh. In 2020, the Delhi Capitals named him as a replacement for their injured player Amit Mishra. 

He made his Twenty20 debut for Karnataka in the 2017–18 Zonal T20 League on 8 January 2018. He made his first-class debut on 11 January 2020, for Karnataka in the 2019–20 Ranji Trophy.  named 27-year-old uncapped leg-spinner Pravin Dube as a replacement for Amit Mishra who was ruled out of IPL 2020 with a finger injury. In February 2022, he was bought by the Delhi Capitals in the auction for the 2022 Indian Premier League tournament.

References

External links
 
 

1993 births
Living people
Indian cricketers
Karnataka cricketers
Royal Challengers Bangalore cricketers
People from Azamgarh